The  Baltimore Colts season was the 14th season for the team in the National Football League. The Baltimore Colts finished the National Football League's 1966 season with a record of 9 wins and 5 losses and finished second in the Western Conference.

Personnel

Staff/coaches

Roster

Regular season

Schedule

Standings

Game summaries

Week 4: at Chicago Bears

Week 13: vs. Green Bay Packers 

Quarterback Zeke Bratkowski, in relief of Bart Starr, who suffered a muscle spasm in the first half, directed an 80-yard drive in the fourth quarter that resulted in a go-ahead touchdown run by Elijah Pitts for the Packers. John Unitas then led the Colts to the Green Bay 15, but there lost a fumble which came to be known as the 'Million Dollar Fumble', to secure the Packers' win that clinched the Western Conference title for Green Bay.

Playoff Bowl

See also 
 History of the Indianapolis Colts
 Indianapolis Colts seasons
 Colts–Patriots rivalry

References 

Baltimore Colts
Baltimore Colts seasons
Baltimore Colts